The 36th Annual GMA Dove Awards, also called the 36th Annual GMA Music Awards, were held on April 13, 2005 recognizing accomplishments of musicians for the year 2004. The show was held at the Grand Ole Opry House in Nashville, Tennessee and was hosted by Steven Curtis Chapman, CeCe Winans, Rebecca St. James, Smokie Norful, Darlene Zschech and Israel Houghton.

Nominations were announced on February 7, 2005 by George Huff, Israel Houghton and Natalie Grant at the Renaissance Hotel in Nashville, Tennessee. 

Switchfoot won Artist of the Year, plus three other awards, while Building 429 was awarded New Artist of the Year. Casting Crowns and The Crabb Family each won four awards, including Group of the Year and Song of the Year for the former. Other multiple winners include: Jeremy Camp, Nicole C. Mullen, Mark Hall, and Israel & New Breed with two awards each.

Performers

Telecast ceremony
The following performed:

Presenters

Telecast ceremony
The following presented:

MercyMe
Michael W. Smith
Joy Williams
Jeremy Camp
TobyMac
Matthew West
Building 429
Nicole C. Mullen
Day of Fire
Phillips, Craig & Dean
Delilah
Rick & Bubba
Shane Hamman
Bobby Labonte

Awards

General

Artist of the Year
Casting Crowns
MercyMe
Michael W. Smith
Selah
Switchfoot

New Artist of the Year
BarlowGirl
Bethany Dillon
Building 429
Day of Fire
Matthew West

Group of the Year
Casting Crowns
MercyMe
Selah
Switchfoot
The Crabb Family

Male Vocalist of the Year
Fernando Ortega
Israel Houghton
Jason Crabb
Jeremy Camp
Mark Hall

Female Vocalist of the Year
Bethany Dillon
Christy Nockels
Joy Williams
Natalie Grant
Nicole C. Mullen

Song of the Year
"Blessed Be Your Name" - Tree63
Matt Redman, Beth Redman, songwriters
"Dare You to Move" – Switchfoot
Jon Foreman, songwriter
"Friend of God" – Israel & New Breed
Michael Gungor, Israel Houghton, songwriters
"Glory Defined" – Building 429
Jason Roy, Jim Cooper, Kenny Lamb, songwriters
"Healing Rain" – Michael W. Smith
Michael W. Smith, Martin Smith, Matt Bronlewee, songwriters
"Meant to Live" – Switchfoot
Jon Foreman, Tim Foreman, songwriters
"More" – Matthew West
Matthew West, Jason Houser, Kenny Greenberg, songwriters
"Through the Fire" – The Crabb Family
Gerald Crabb, songwriter
"Who Am I" – Casting Crowns
Mark Hall, songwriter
"You Raise Me Up" – Selah
Brendan Graham, Rolf Løvland, songwriters

Songwriter of the Year
Mark Hall

Producer of the Year
Ed Cash

Pop

Pop/Contemporary Recorded Song of the Year
 "Healing Rain" – Michael W. Smith
 "Letters From War" – Mark Schultz
 "Live for Today" – Natalie Grant
 "More" – Matthew West
 "Who Am I" – Casting Crowns

Pop/Contemporary Album of the Year
All Things New – Steven Curtis Chapman
Bethany Dillon – Bethany Dillon
Happy – Matthew West
Healing Rain – Michael W. Smith
Undone – MercyMeRock

Rock Recorded Song of the Year
 "Come on Back to Me" – Third Day
 "Cornerstone" – Day of Fire
 "Everything About You" – Sanctus Real
 "Stay" – Jeremy Camp "Without You" – Nate Sallie

Rock Album of the YearDay of Fire – Day of FireSea of Faces – Kutless
Set It Off – Thousand Foot Krutch
They're Only Chasing Safety – Underoath
Where Do We Go from Here – Pillar

Rock/Contemporary Recorded Song of the Year
 "American Dream" – Casting Crowns
 "Dare You to Move" – Switchfoot "Glory Defined" – Building 429
 "Never Alone" – BarlowGirl
 "Show You Love" – Jars of Clay

Rock/Contemporary Album of the YearWire – Third DayModern Rock Recorded Song of the Year"Control" – MutemathModern Rock Album of the YearFight the Tide – Sanctus RealRap/Hip-Hop

Rap/Hip Hop Recorded Song of the Year
 "Hittin' Curves" – GRITSRap/Hip Hop Album of the YearWelcome to Diverse City – TobyMacInspirational

Inspirational Recorded Song of the Year
 "Arms Open Wide" – David Phelps
 "Still the Cross" – FFH
 "Untitled Hymn (Come to Jesus)" – Chris Rice
 "Voice of Truth" – Casting Crowns "You Can’t Imagine" – The Crabb Family
 "You Raise Me Up" – Selah

Inspirational Album of the YearHiding Place – SelahGospel

Southern Gospel Recorded Song of the Year
 "He Came Looking for Me" – The Crabb Family

Southern Gospel Album of the YearDriven – The Crabb FamilyFaces – Greater Vision
Faith, Hope, Joy – Young Harmony
Some Things Never Change – Mark Lowry
This I Know – Eartha

Traditional Gospel Recorded Song of the Year
 "Glory to His Name" – Delores “Mom” Winans
 "Search Me Lord" – Lynda Randle
 "Still Here" – The Williams Brothers
 "That’s Reason Enough" – Bishop Paul S. Morton
 "Through the Fire" – The Crabb Family (featuring Donnie McClurkin) "We’ve Come To Praise Him" – Joe Pace

Traditional Gospel Album of the YearA Tribute to Mahalia Jackson – Lynda RandleHymns From My Heart – Delores “Mom” Winans
Joe Pace Presents Sunday Morning Service – Joe Pace
Still Here – The Williams Brothers
The Water I Give – Dottie Peoples

Contemporary Gospel Recorded Song of the Year
 "Again I Say Rejoice" – Israel & New Breed "Because of Who You Are" – Martha Munizzi
 "Celebrate (He Lives)" – Fred Hammond
 "In the Middle" – Smokie Norful
 "Miracle of Love" – BeBe Winans and Angie Stone
 "Say the Name" – Martha Munizzi
 "Undignified" – Stephen Hurd

Contemporary Gospel Album of the YearLive From Another Level – Israel & New BreedCountry & Bluegrass

Country Recorded Song of the Year
 "Forever" – The Crabb Family "I Need You Now" – Billy Ray Cyrus
 "Just a Closer Walk With Thee" – Joe Nichols
 "Rescue Me" – Wynonna
 "The Heat of the Battle" – Mike Bowling

Country Album of the Year
Heroes – The IsaacsPassing Through – Randy TravisSunshine – Jeff & Sheri Easter
The Journey – The Oak Ridge Boys
Where I Stand – Mike Bowling

Bluegrass Recorded Song of the Year
 "Heroes" – The Isaacs "Little Mountain Church House" – George Hamilton IV with The Moody Brothers
 "The Journey" – The Oak Ridge Boys
 "Traveling Shoes" – The Lewis Family
 "Walking Through the Fire" – Misty Freeman

Bluegrass Album of the Year
A Snow Covered Mound – The PrinciplesAngels Gathering Flowers – The Lewis FamilyThank God – Doyle Lawson & Quicksilver
The Log Cabin, Vol. 4 – Bobby All
Will Play for Pie – Chigger Hill Boys & Terri

Praise & Worship

Worship Song of the Year"Blessed Be Your Name" – Tree63Matt Redman, Beth Redman, songwriters"Healing Rain" – Michael W. Smith
Michael W. Smith, Martin Smith, Matt Bronlewee, songwriters
"Here I Am to Worship" – 
Tim Hughes, songwriter
"I Bless Your Name" – Selah
Elizabeth Goodine, songwriter
"Who Am I" – Casting Crowns
Mark Hall, songwriter

Praise & Worship Album of the YearArriving – Chris TomlinUrban

Urban Recorded Song of the Year"You Don't Know" – Kierra "Kiki" SheardUrban Album of the YearEveryday People – Nicole C. MullenOthers

Instrumental Album of the Year
Caribbean Christmas – Chris McDonald
Handprint – Barry D.
Piano Hymns: If You Could Hear What I See – Gordon Mote
Songs of December: The Familiar Classics – Various artistsThe Passion of the Christ Original Motion Picture Soundtrack – Various artists

Children's Music Album of the YearAngel Alert! – Various artists

Spanish Language Album of the YearCosas Poderosas – Coalo ZamoranoLuz en Mi Vida – Pablo OlivaresRecordando Otra Vez – Marcos WittTe Amo Dios – Praise Street Worship BandTiempo de Navidad – Marcos Witt

Special Event Album of the YearThe Passion of the Christ: Songs (Lost Keyword Records/Wind-up Records)

Choral Collection of the YearBlessing, Honor and Praise – Dave WilliamsonCloser – Geron Davis and Bradley KnightLive...This is Your House – Carol CymbalaStart It Up – Christ Church Choir
The Cross Said It All – Lari Goss

Recorded Music Packaging of the YearHappy – Matthew WestMusicals

Musical of the YearEmmanuel: Celebrating Heaven’s ChildYouth/Children's Musical of the YearFear Not FactorVideos

Short Form Music Video of the Year
"Dare You to Move" – Switchfoot
Robert Hales (video director), Nina Grossman Warner (video producer)

Long Form Music Video of the Year'Switchfoot Live In San Diego – SwitchfootDwight Thompson (video director and producer)'''

Artists with multiple nominations and awards 

The following artists received multiple nominations:
 Eight: Michael W. Smith
 Seven: Casting Crowns
 Six: Mark Hall, The Crabb Family, Gerald Crabb
 Five: Switchfoot, Israel Houghton, MercyMe, Matthew West
 Four: Steven Curtis Chapman, BarlowGirl, Selah, Jeremy Camp, Martha Munizzi, Martin Smith, Joe Pace, Sanctus Real, J. Moss and Matt Redman
 Three: Jon Foreman
 Two: Israel & New Breed, Marcos Witt

The following artists received multiple awards:
 Four: Casting Crowns, Switchfoot, The Crabb Family
 Two: Jeremy Camp, Nicole C. Mullen, Mark Hall, Israel & New Breed

References

External links
 http://www.gmamusicawards.com
 https://doveawards.com/awards/past-winners

2005 music awards
GMA Dove Awards
2005 in American music
2005 in Tennessee
GMA